The 2003–04 season in Dutch football saw Ajax regain their title in the Eredivisie. Zwolle were relegated to the First Division.

Johan Cruyff Shield

Eredivisie

Awards

Dutch Footballer of the Year
 2003–04 — Maxwell (Ajax)

Dutch Golden Shoe Winner
 2003 — Dirk Kuyt (Utrecht)
 2004 — Maxwell (Ajax)

Ajax squad 2003–04

Goal
 Sander Boschker
 Bogdan Lobonț
 Maarten Stekelenburg

Defence
 Jelle Van Damme
 Julien Escudé
 Zdeněk Grygera
 John Heitinga
 Nigel de Jong
 John O'Brien
 Petri Pasanen
 Hatem Trabelsi
 Thomas Vermaelen
 Fronio Walker

 Abubakari Yakubu

Midfield
 Tomáš Galásek
 Cedric van der Gun
 Jari Litmanen
 Maxwell
 Anthony Obodai
 Steven Pienaar
 Stefano Seedorf
 Wesley Sneijder
 Rafael van der Vaart

Attack
 Jamal Akachar
 Yannis Anastasiou

 Ryan Babel
 Nourdin Boukhari
 Jason Culina
 Zlatan Ibrahimović
 Nicolae Mitea
 Tom De Mul
 Daniël de Ridder
 Victor Sikora
 Tom Soetaers
 Wesley Sonck
 Wamberto

Management
 Ronald Koeman (Coach)
 Ruud Krol (Assistant)
 Tonny Bruins Slot (Assistant)

Eerste Divisie

Promoted : FC Den Bosch
Promotion / relegation play-offs ("Nacompetitie"): Excelsior, Sparta, Heracles, Helmond Sport, De Graafschap and VVV Venlo

Topscorers

Promotion and relegation

Group A

Group B

Stayed / Promoted : Vitesse Arnhem and De Graafschap
Relegated: Volendam

KNVB Cup

Dutch national team

See also
Sparta Rotterdam season 2003–04

References
 Voetbal International
RSSSF Archive